Alchi is a village in the Leh district of Ladakh, India. It is located in the Likir tehsil, on the banks of the Indus River 70 km downstream from the capital Leh. Unlike the other gompas in Ladakh, Alchi is situated on lowland, not on a hilltop.

The Alchi Monastery or Alchi Gompa lies about 65 km from Leh on the banks of the Indus River.

History
The village is famous for the existence of one of the oldest monasteries in Ladakh (a national heritage) Alchi Monastery, mainly known for its magnificent and well-preserved 11th- or 12th-century wall paintings, all in an Indo-Himalayan style. The monastery houses thousands of rare and unique sculptures and paintings back to 11th century Western Tibet.

Demographics
According to the 2011 census of India, Alchi has 145 households. The effective literacy rate (i.e. the literacy rate of population excluding children aged 6 and below) is 72.51%.

Alchi is a small village with several tourist homestays, most offering modern conveniences for overnight stays, The best time to visit is from June to September.

References

External links 

 Alchi monastery
April 2010 Smithsonian Magazine Article

Villages in Likir tehsil